Vladimir Yemelyanov(Russian:ВЛАДИМИР ЕМЕЛЬЯНОВ) (born April 22, 1970 in Gomel), also known as Vladimir Emelyanov, is a weightlifter who competed for Belarus in the 1996 Summer Olympics. He won a silver medal at the European championships in 1995.

References

External links
 
 
 
 

1976 births
Living people
Belarusian male weightlifters
Olympic weightlifters of Belarus
Weightlifters at the 1996 Summer Olympics
Sportspeople from Gomel